Liparis fleckeri, commonly known as the slender sphinx orchid, is a plant in the orchid family and is endemic to Queensland. It is an epiphytic or lithophytic orchid with two thin leaves and up to twenty pale green or whitish flowers.

Description
The sepals and petals are tapered and curve downwards. Flowering occurs between May and August.

Taxonomy and naming
Liparis fleckeri was first formally described in 1938 by William Henry Nicholls from a specimen collected by Hugo Flecker on Mount Bellenden Ker. The description was published in The North Queensland Naturalist, the specific epithet (fleckeri) honouring Hugo Flecker.

Distribution and habitat

References 

fleckeri
Orchids of Queensland
Plants described in 1938